Sourav Das (born 20 June 1996), is an Indian professional footballer who plays as a defensive midfielder for Chennaiyin in the Indian Super League.

Career statistics

Club

Honours

Club
Mohun Bagan
Calcutta Football League (1): 2018–19

References 

Mohun Bagan AC players
East Bengal Club players
Indian Super League players
Association football midfielders
Indian footballers
Footballers from Kolkata
Living people
1996 births
Mumbai City FC players
I-League players